Chandra Bahadur Gurung is a Nepalese politician, belonging to the Communist Party of Nepal (Unified Marxist-Leninist). In the 2008 Constituent Assembly election he was elected from the Mustang-1 constituency, winning 2456 votes.

References

Living people
Communist Party of Nepal (Unified Marxist–Leninist) politicians
Year of birth missing (living people)
Gurung people

Members of the 1st Nepalese Constituent Assembly
Members of the 2nd Nepalese Constituent Assembly